Maren Wiesler (born 7 February 1993) is a German alpine ski racer.

She competed at the 2015 World Championships in Beaver Creek, USA, where she placed 12th in the slalom.

World Championship results

References

1993 births
German female alpine skiers
Living people
21st-century German women